Från nu till evighet is an album by Swedish singer Carola Häggkvist. It was released in May 2006 in Sweden and Norway. On the album charts, the album peaked at number one in Sweden, number 22 in Finland and number 25 in Norway.

Track listing
 "Jag ger allt" (S Almqvist / P Thyrén / K Marcello / Carola Häggkvist) 
 "Ingenting du säger" (S Almqvist / P Thyrén / K Marcello / Carola Häggkvist) 
 "Evighet" (Bobby Ljungren /Thomas G:son / H Wikström /Carola Häggkvist) 
 "Stanna eller gå" (Thomas G:son / Carola Häggkvist) 
 "Vem kan älska mig" (Thomas G:son / Carola Häggkvist) 
 "För alltid" (Bobby Ljungren /Thomas G:son / H Wikström) 
 "Fast det är mörkt nu" (S Almqvist / Carola Häggkvist) 
 "Tro på kärleken" (N Molinder / J Persson / P Ankarberg) 
 "Jag lever livet" (Thomas G:son / Carola Häggkvist) 
 "Nära dig" (Bobby Ljungren / Thomas G:son / Carola Häggkvist) 
 "Genom allt" (radioversion) (Carola Häggkvist) 
 "Invincible" (Bobby Ljungren / Thomas G:son / H Wikström)

Singles

Evighet
01. Evighet 
02. Evighet (instrumental)

 Sweden # 1
 Norway # 8

Invincible
01. Invincible 
02. Invincible (instrumental)

 Sweden # 29
 Belgium # 6

Release history

Charts

Weekly charts

Year-end charts

References

2006 albums
Carola Häggkvist albums
Swedish-language albums